Guaianases may refer to:

 Subprefecture of Guaianases, São Paulo
 Guaianases (district of São Paulo)
 Guaianases station, São Paulo's Line 11 (CPTM)